Langenfeld-Berghausen station is located in the city of Langenfeld in the German state of North Rhine-Westphalia. It is on the Cologne–Duisburg line and is classified by Deutsche Bahn as a category 5 station.  It is served by Rhine-Ruhr S-Bahn lines S 6 every 20 minutes and by a few services of S 68 in the peak hour.

Services 

Currently, the station is served by two S-Bahn lines and two bus routes: 777 (operated by Rheinbahn and Bahnen der Stadt Monheim) and 787 (operated by Rheinbahn and Kreisverkehrsgesellschaft Mettmann).

Notes

Rhine-Ruhr S-Bahn stations
S6 (Rhine-Ruhr S-Bahn)
S68 (Rhine-Ruhr S-Bahn)
Railway stations in Germany opened in 1971
Railway stations in Germany opened in 1972
Buildings and structures in Mettmann (district)